Bergamot may refer to:

Plants
 Bergamot orange
 Bergamot essential oil
Monarda, genus of herbaceous plants of similar odor to the bergamot orange; in particular
Monarda didyma, called bergamot, scarlet beebalm, scarlet monarda, Oswego tea, or crimson beebalm
Monarda fistulosa, called wild bergamot or bee balm 
Eau de Cologne mint, also called bergamot mint
(in France) Citrus limetta, called sweet lime or sweet lemon in English

Other
HMS Bergamot, one of the ships of the Royal Navy of the United Kingdom
Bergamot (arts center), an art gallery facility in Santa Monica, California, United States
26th Street/Bergamot station, a station on the light-rail Expo Line, adjacent to the art gallery facility in Santa Monica, California, United States

See also
Bergamo (disambiguation)